The men's 4 × 100 metre medley relay competition of the swimming events at the 1955 Pan American Games took place on 21 March. It was the first appearance of this event in the Pan American Games.

Results
All times are in minutes and seconds.

Heats

Final 
The final was held on March 21.

References

Swimming at the 1955 Pan American Games